The View is the second studio album by drummer Chad Wackerman, released in 1993 through CMP Records; it was later reissued together with Wackerman's 1991 album Forty Reasons as a limited edition double-disc compilation.

Critical reception

Alex Henderson at AllMusic gave The View three stars out of five, calling it "worthwhile fusion [...] which falls short of remarkable but is a decent, respectable effort".

Track listing

Personnel
Chad Wackerman – drums, percussion, production
Allan Holdsworth – guitar (tracks 1, 4, 5, 8, 9, 13)
Carl Verheyen – guitar (tracks 2, 3, 6, 7, 10, 12)
Jim Cox – clavinet, synthesizer, piano, organ
Jimmy Johnson – bass
Walt Fowler – trumpet, flugelhorn
Walter Quintus – mixing, production
Judy Clapp – engineering
Kurt Renker – production

References

Chad Wackerman albums
1993 albums

Albums recorded at Capitol Studios